Mount Gauss is the northernmost peak of the Kirkwood Range in Victoria Land, Antarctica. It was discovered by the British National Antarctic Expedition, 1901–04, which named this feature after Professor Carl Friedrich Gauss, a German mathematician and astronomer.

References

Mountains of Victoria Land
Scott Coast